Ajnabi Saaya is a 1998 Hindi-language Horror film directed and produced by Prasun Banerjee, starring Mithun Chakraborty, Aditya Pancholi and Pratibha Sinha.

Plot 
Sheila, a young woman dies in a road accident but her husband Rajesh recovers from it after a year. He is going to marry again with Sunita but his first wife appears very often. Rajesh is in trauma whether Sheila is really alive or not.

Cast
 Mithun Chakraborty
 Aditya Pancholi
 Pratibha Sinha
 Shiva Rindani
 Deepak Shirke
 Shakti Kapoor
Kiran Kumar
 Kishore Bhanushali

Soundtrack
"Aa Ke Manzil Pe" - Kumar Sanu
"Aaiye Aaiye" - Sapna Mukherjee
"Aaiye Aaiye v2" - Sapna Mukherjee
"Jaane Yeh Kya Ho Gaya" - Hemlata
"Kathak Karega Bhangra" - Kavita Krishnamurthy
"Mujhe Peene Ki Aadat Nahin" - Kumar Sanu

References

External links

Hindi-language horror films
1990s Hindi-language films
1998 films
Indian horror drama films